Knifefish may refer to several knife-shaped fishes:
The Neotropical or weakly electric knifefishes, order Gymnotiformes, containing five families:
Family Gymnotidae (banded knifefishes and the electric eel)
Family Rhamphichthyidae (sand knifefishes)
Family Hypopomidae (bluntnose knifefishes)
Family Sternopygidae (glass and rat-tail knifefishes)
Family Apteronotidae (ghost knifefishes)
The featherbacks, family Notopteridae.
The aba, Gymnarchus niloticus
Four other unrelated fish species not in any of the above families:
Grey knifefish, Bathystethus cultratus.
Blue knifefish, Labracoglossa nitida.
Collared knifefish or finscale razorfish, Cymolutes torquatus.
Jack-knifefish, Equetus lanceolatus.

See also
Knifefish (robot), an American military robot

Gymnotiformes